The 1992 European Open was a professional ranking snooker tournament that took place in March 1992 at the Tongeren Snooker Centre in Tongeren, Belgium.

Jimmy White won the tournament, defeating Mark Johnston-Allen 9–3 in the final.


Main draw

References

European Masters (snooker)
European Open
European Open (snooker)
European Open (snooker)
Snooker in Belgium